"Stefania" is a 2022 song by Ukrainian folk-rap group Kalush Orchestra, co-written by all group members alongside Ivan Klymenko and was released through Sony Music Entertainment. The song represented Ukraine in the Eurovision Song Contest 2022 in Turin, Italy, which it won. 

"Stefania" has been described as an alternative hip hop and folk song. It is the third song sung entirely in Ukrainian to represent Ukraine at Eurovision, but the second to compete at the contest following the cancellation of Eurovision 2020. The song won the contest with 631 points, becoming the first rap song and the first song sung entirely in Ukrainian to win. "Stefania" charted in twenty-two music markets, topping the charts in Ukraine and Lithuania, while also reaching the top ten within Finland, Croatia, Iceland, Hungary and Sweden.

Background and composition 
"Stefania" has been described as an ode to a mother, with the narrator speaking of good memories of his own mother. The song initially talks about how much his mother has aged, invoking a nostalgic past. The song later addresses the hardships of a mother, with the narrator realizing how much the mother has done for him. A "lullaby", within the end of each rap verse, brings the narrator back to when his mother took care of him. The song is dedicated to frontman Oleh Psiuk's mother, who is also named Stefania. Two days after Kalush Orchestra was chosen to represent Ukraine in Eurovision, Russia launched a full-scale invasion of Ukraine, and "Stefania" subsequently became a popular wartime soundtrack on social media.

Two traditional Ukrainian woodwind instruments are featured heavily in the song: the sopilka and the telenka.

Music video 
The music video for the song, directed by Max Ksjonda, was released on 15 May, shortly after the song won Eurovision. The video was filmed in April in the cities of Bucha, Irpin, Borodianka, and Hostomel, all of which had been attacked during the 2022 Russian invasion of Ukraine. The video depicts military women in destroyed cities taking numerous children away from burning and bombed-out buildings, and returning them to their mothers.

Reception 
After winning the Eurovision Song Contest, Kalush Orchestra collected 54 million hryvnias in support of Ukraine through its concerts, charity meetings and auctions. This amount does not include funds from joint concerts with other artists. The group subsequently embarked on a promotional tour across Europe and North America to collect donations in support of Ukraine. European viewers were urged to donate to the "Save Ukrainian Culture" initiative, created with the support of the Ukrainian Ministry of Culture. During their time at London's Glastonbury Festival in June 2022, Kalush Orchestra performed "Stefania" for female volunteers who help Ukrainian refugees in London. The group additionally performed the song at the Royal Horse Guards Parade in front of the Palace of Whitehall in central London.

In August 2022, Kalush Orchestra performed in the Italian city of Monopoli at the Madonna della Madia festival, with the participation of Ukrainian immigrant children, who danced and sang "Stefania" on stage. On the eve of Ukrainian Independence Day, 23 August, Kalush Orchestra announced a 24-hour fundraiser of 24 hryvnias for the rehabilitation of Ukrainian soldiers in Mariupol.

Eurovision Song Contest

Vidbir 2022 
The selection of the competing entries for  took place over three stages. In the first stage, artists and songwriters had the opportunity to apply for the competition through an online submission form. Twenty-seven acts were longlisted and announced on 17 January 2022. The second stage was a scheduled audition at designated dates and featured the twenty-seven acts in the longlist. Eight acts were selected to advance, which were announced on 24 January 2022. The third stage was the final, which took place on 12 February 2022 and featured the eight acts vying to represent Ukraine in Turin.

Artists and composers had the opportunity to submit their entries between 14 December 2021 and 10 January 2022. Only artists that had not performed in a concert in Russia since 2014 or entered the territory of Crimea since 2014 were able to apply for the competition. A selection panel including the music producer of the show, Mykhailo Koshevy, and the television producer of the show, Oleksiy Honcharenko, reviewed the 284 submissions, and twenty-seven entries that had been longlisted were announced on 17 January 2022. Auditions were later held at the My Dream Space venue in Kyiv where eight entries were shortlisted to compete in the national final. On 24 January 2022, the eight selected competing acts were announced. In the Vidbir final, held on 12 February, Alina Pash emerged as the winner with the song "Shadows of Forgotten Ancestors", but she ultimately declined her position after being involved in a controversy for having breached the rule barring  competitors from having traveled to Russia or Crimea. As a result, Kalush Orchestra were offered to represent Ukraine in replacement of Pash. On 22 February, the group accepted the offer.

At Eurovision 
According to Eurovision rules, all nations with the exceptions of the host country and the "Big Five" (France, Germany, Italy, Spain and the United Kingdom) are required to qualify from one of two semi-finals in order to compete for the final; the top ten countries from each semi-final progress to the final. The European Broadcasting Union (EBU) split up the competing countries into six different pots based on voting patterns from previous contests, with countries with favourable voting histories put into the same pot. On 25 January 2022, an allocation draw was held which placed each country into one of the two semi-finals, as well as which half of the show they would perform in. Ukraine was placed into the first semi-final held on 10 May 2022, and performed in the first half of the show. Kalush Orchestra advanced to the grand final, which they went on to win.

At the end of the jury vote, Ukraine finished in 4th place. The 439 points received by Ukraine from the televote in the final are the most televoting points received in the contest's history to date, and Ukraine also received points from every country in the televote (with all but Malta, North Macedonia and Serbia giving the country 10 or 12 points). Ukraine was just 29 points from the highest possible score from the televoting.

Charts

Weekly charts

Monthly charts

Year-end charts

Certifications

References 

2022 songs
2022 singles
Eurovision Song Contest winning songs
Eurovision songs of Ukraine
Eurovision songs of 2022
Sony Music singles
Ukrainian-language songs
Songs about mothers
2022 Russian invasion of Ukraine in popular culture
Ukrainian folk songs